Gustav Waldau (27 February 1871 – 25 May 1958) was a German actor. He appeared in more than 100 films between 1915 and 1955.

Selected filmography

 The Gentleman Without a Residence (1915)
 In Thrall to the Claw (1921)
 The Wrong Husband (1931)
 A Man with Heart (1932)
 A Mad Idea (1932)
 Season in Cairo (1933)
 Little Dorrit (1934)
 Just Once a Great Lady (1934)
 So Ended a Great Love (1934)
 Farewell Waltz (1934)
 Winter Night's Dream (1935)
 A Night on the Danube (1935)
 She and the Three (1935)
 The Three Around Christine (1936)
 Victoria in Dover (1936)
 Such Great Foolishness (1937)
The Chief Witness (1937)
 The Voice of the Heart (1937)
 The Great and the Little Love (1938)
 Frau Sixta (1938)
 Three Wonderful Days (1939)
 A Hopeless Case (1939)
 Gold in New Frisco (1939)
 The Girl from Barnhelm (1940)
 Falstaff in Vienna (1940)
 A Man Astray (1940)
 The Vulture Wally (1940)
 Our Miss Doctor (1940)
 Operetta (1940)
 Geheimakte W.B.1 (1942)
 The Little Residence (1942)
 Between Heaven and Earth (1942)
 Beloved World (1942)
 The Second Shot (1943)
 The Endless Road (1943)
 Late Love (1943)
 Come Back to Me (1944)
 Fregola (1948)
 The Angel with the Trumpet (1948)
 The Other Life (1948)
 Eroica (1949)
 Eine große Liebe (1949)
 Dear Friend (1949)
 Don't Dream, Annette (1949)
 Two Times Lotte (1950)
 Who Is This That I Love? (1950)
 Regimental Music (1950)
 King for One Night (1950)
 Dr. Holl (1951)
 Immortal Light (1951)
 Monks, Girls and Hungarian Soldiers (1952)
 Two People (1952)
 The Night Without Morals (1953)
 Your Heart Is My Homeland (1953)
 Marriage Strike (1953)
 The Silent Angel (1954)
 Hubertus Castle (1954)

References

External links

1871 births
1958 deaths
20th-century German male actors
German male film actors
German male silent film actors
People from Landshut (district)
Male actors from Bavaria